Cornelius Kersten (born July 19, 1994) is a British speed skater who represented Great Britain at the 2022 Winter Olympics.

Career

At the 2023 World Single Distances Speed Skating Championships, Kersten won a bronze medal in the 1000 metres events, becoming the first British representative to win a medal at the single distance world championships.

Personal records

References

External links

1994 births
Living people
British male speed skaters
Speed skaters at the 2020 Winter Youth Olympics
Olympic speed skaters of Great Britain
Speed skaters at the 2022 Winter Olympics
World Single Distances Speed Skating Championships medalists